Giovanni Angelo Testagrossa (9 April 1470 – December 1530) was an Italian lutenist 
and singer. He was born in Pavia and worked in Milan, Mantua, Ferrara and many other cities. Testagrossa was a renowned teacher; his pupils included Isabella d'Este. A long-standing hypothesis that Testagrossa taught Francesco Canova da Milano is now considered unlikely to be true (Wilson, 1997, citing Franco Pavan). None of Testagrossa's compositions survive.

References
 
 Wilson, Christopher. 1997. Comments on the 1997 The Francesco da Milano International Symposium. Available online.

Composers for lute
15th-century Italian composers
16th-century Italian composers
Italian male composers
Italian lutenists
Musicians from Pavia
1470 births
1530 deaths